Oceans is the second studio album by London-based British-Japanese rock band Esprit D'Air. It was released on 18 February 2022, through the band's own Starstorm Records with a distribution partnership with AWAL and Plastic Head Distribution. Work on the album began in 2018, but was halted due to the theft of producer and singer Kai's laptop and backups in 2019, which delayed new singles and the album releases.

Esprit D'Air completed the album in late in 2021 after successfully crowdfunding the album. Oceans is a very genre-fluid album containing various metal and rock genres with elements of electronics and piano. It was produced entirely by Kai with collaborations from session musicians and featured artists including Ben Christo from the Sisters of Mercy and Ryo Kinoshita from Crystal Lake, and Japanese vocaloid artist UmiKazeTaiyou.

Composition 
Critics have identified the style to be genre-fluid with various tracks ranging from djent and electronicore to power metal and post-rock. The use of digital synthesizer is prevalent in most tracks, much like their debut album Constellations.

Singles 
Esprit D'Air released multiple singles from the album including their most popular song 'Leviathan', which premiered on Loudwire, as well as songs such as "The Abyss" featuring Ryo Kinoshita from Crystal Lake, and "Dead Zone" featuring Ben Christo from The Sisters of Mercy.

Reception

Critical
The release of 'Leviathan' garnered some praise from peers with The Sisters of Mercy's Ben Christo stating of the song, "It's a really unique blend of djent, industrial, electro, goth, emo, metal and much more. I love the dramatics and cinematic quality it has, with haunting, melancholy colors swooping betwixt the cruel, relentless jaws of the machine." Michael Falcore of The Birthday Massacre stated that 'Leviathan' is a "wonderful song, feels like a modern day opera with heavy guitars set on fire! Melancholic and haunting, the vocals cut deep. A truly inspired song."

About the track, 'Dead Zone', Richard Shaw, the guitarist of Cradle of Filth stated, "Catchy and atmospheric, with incredible vocals and an otherworldly guitar solo. What a song!".

PowerPlay Magazine gave Oceans a 10/10 review, and a live review, citing that "In the 25 years that I've been publishing Powerplay and of the thousands of bands that I've seen play live, this rated as one of the most crushingly intense shows that I've ever experienced".

Radio coverage

Both 'Calling You' and 'Amethyst' were played on BBC Radio's F.N.A.T. show. 

'Leviathan' was played on BBC Radio 1's Future Alternative show with Nels Hylton and Kerrang! Radio's Fresh Blood with Alex Baker. About 'Leviathan', Nels Hylton states, "Gargantuan, taking electronic-sounding elements and just layering it over some of the best guitar riffs I’ve heard in a minute.", whilst Alex Baker states, "Showcases how these guys have the ability to mix up so many flavors. It's proggy, cinematic, it's synthy, it's a bit DragonForce-y at times, a bit metal-y, but all the time, it's bloody great." 

Ollie Winiberg (BBC Radio 1) also stated, "One of the most phenomenal guitar players I have seen in years, going by the name of Esprit D'Air." on his Heavy Hooks podcast.

'The Abyss' was played on TotalRock and Midlands Metalheads Radio.

Commercial
Despite not being on a major record label and releasing independently, "Oceans" peaked at number 8 on the UK Rock and Metal Albums Chart, and number 5 on the UK Independent Albums Chart and has re-entered and stayed in the Official Charts for several weeks in 2022. It was their first album to reach the UK charts.

Tour dates 
Esprit D'Air announced a string of tour dates to perform songs from the Oceans album, including an album launch party at the O2 Academy Islington, London.

Track listing

Personnel

Production
 Kai – lead vocals, guitar, bass, drums, piano, synthesizer, production, programming, recording engineer, art direction and typography
 Paul Visser – mixing and mastering engineer (all tracks except 1, 12, 13, 15, 17, 19 and 20)

Session musicians
 Ryoma Takahashi – co-producer and writer (tracks 2 and 14)
 Yusuke Okamoto – co-producer and writer (track 4)
 UmiKazeTaiyou – co-producer and writer (track 9)
 Takeshi Tokunaga – co-producer and writer (track 10), bass (tracks 3, 10 and 14)
 Yoshisuke Suga – writer (track 16)
 Tatsuya Nashimoto – producer (track 16)
 Jan-Vincent Velazco – drums (track 14 and 18)
 Sougo Akiyoshi – drums (track 7 and 8)
 Ryo Kinoshita – additional vocals and lyrics (track 5)
 Ben Christo – additional vocals and lyrics (track 6)

Artwork
 Lewis-Jon Somerscales – disc and inlay innerpage artwork 
 Alex Kie – photographer

Remixers
 Heavygrinder – remix engineer (track 17)
 Shirobon – remix engineer (track 20)

Charts

References

2022 albums
Self-released albums
Esprit D'Air albums